The 2018–19 season was the Persepolis's 18th season in the Pro League, and their 36th consecutive season in the top division of Iranian Football. They were competing in the Hazfi Cup, Super Cup and AFC Champions League.

Squad

First team squad

New Contracts

Transfers

In

Out

Technical staff 

|}

Competitions

Overview

Persian Gulf Pro League

League table

Results summary

Results by round

Matches

Hazfi Cup

Matches

Super Cup

AFC Champions League

2018 AFC Champions League

2019 AFC Champions League

Group stage

Matches

Friendly Matches

Pre-season

During season

Statistics

Scorers

Assists

Goalkeeping

 
* Beiranvand kept 7 clean sheets in 2018 ACL, 5 clean sheets happened before quarterfinal in 2017–18 season.

Disciplinary record

Bookings & sending-off

Suspensions

Injuries During The Season 
Players in bold are still out from their injuries.

Notes
DM Substituted during match.
R Player released by The Club during his injury time.

Club

Kit 

|
|

Sponsorship 

Main sponsor: Irancell
Official shirt manufacturer: Li-Ning

References

External links 
Iran Premier League Statistics
Persian League
Persepolis News

Persepolis F.C. seasons
Persepolis